Waldwick is a commuter rail station operated by New Jersey Transit in the borough of Waldwick, Bergen County, New Jersey, United States.

History

This station did not open along with the rest of the Paterson and Ramapo Railroad on October 19, 1848. The Erie Railroad, who took over that railroad, established a stop at Waldwick . A wooden station depot was built on the east side of the tracks at that point. The historic original station house has been listed in the state and federal registers of historic places since 1978 and is part of the Operating Passenger Railroad Stations Thematic Resource. The Waldwick Community Alliance has leased the building for 25 years until 2034. After years of being in disrepair, it has been restored and now houses the Waldwick Museum of Local History.

Station layout
This station has three tracks, the outer two of which are served by low-level side platforms, which are connect by a pedestrian bridge at their southern ends. As a result, the station is inaccessible for handicapped people as part of the Americans With Disabilities Act of 1990. Some weekday Bergen County Line trains originate and terminate at this station. A multiple-track yard (Waldwick Yard) is located at the north end of the station complex to house locomotives and other equipment.

Gallery

See also 
 Erie Railroad Signal Tower, Waldwick Yard
 List of New Jersey Transit stations
 Operating Passenger Railroad Stations Thematic Resource (New Jersey)
 National Register of Historic Places listings in Bergen County, New Jersey

References

External links

 Waldwick Community Alliance
 Station House from Google Maps Street View

NJ Transit Rail Operations stations
Railway stations on the National Register of Historic Places in New Jersey
Railway stations in Bergen County, New Jersey
Railway stations in the United States opened in 1886
Former Erie Railroad stations
National Register of Historic Places in Bergen County, New Jersey
Waldwick, New Jersey
1886 establishments in New Jersey
New Jersey Register of Historic Places